Widower Jarl (Swedish: Änkeman Jarl) is a 1945 Swedish comedy film directed by Sigurd Wallén and starring Wallén, Dagmar Ebbesen, Sven Magnusson and Ingrid Backlin. It was shot at the Sundbyberg Studios in Stockholm with location shooting around Växjö and Tingsryd. The film's sets were designed by the art director Max Linder. It is based on the 1940 play Widower Jarl by Vilhelm Moberg.

Synopsis
Andreas, a widowed Småland villager, is planning to get remarried to Gustava. His children oppose the marriage, fearing it may lose them their inheritance while a local shoemaker has designs on Gustava himself.

Cast
 Sigurd Wallén as 	Andreas Jarl
 Dagmar Ebbesen as 	Gustava Hägg
 Arthur Fischer as Mandus
 Sven Magnusson as 	Albert
 Ingrid Backlin as 	Ellen
 Maritta Marke as 	Martina
 Carl Ström as 	Tradesman
 Lisskulla Jobs as 	Hilma
 Eivor Landström as 	Karin
 Rune Stylander as Edvin
 Birgitta Arman as 	Greta 
 Helga Brofeldt as Gossip lady 
 Ragnar Falck as 	Arvid 
 Sigge Fürst as 	Olsson 
 Ingemar Holde as 	Shop assistant 
 Eva Stiberg as 	Blenda 
 Lillie Wästfeldt as 	Old woman on bus

References

Bibliography 
 Krawc, Alfred. International Directory of Cinematographers, Set- and Costume Designers in Film: Denmark, Finland, Norway, Sweden (from the beginnings to 1984). Saur, 1986.

External links 
 

1945 films
Swedish comedy films
1945 comedy films
1940s Swedish-language films
Films directed by Sigurd Wallén
Swedish films based on plays
Films based on works by Vilhelm Moberg
1940s Swedish films